Artpace (also known as Artpace San Antonio) is a non-profit contemporary art foundation located in downtown San Antonio, Texas that is free and open to the public. Founded by artist, collector, and philanthropist Linda Pace,  Artpace opened its doors in 1995, and focuses on nurturing the creative and artistic processes of both established and emerging artists. Fostering opportunities for dialogue and social interactions between artists and community members of all ages has always been central to the various programs at Artpace.

Once a former 1920s Hudson automobile dealership, Artpace utilizes its 18,000 square feet of industrial space to exhibit contemporary art in five separate exhibition spaces including: the Hudson Showroom the Main Space gallery and three separate artist exhibition spaces. There are also three furnished apartments for visiting artists and curators to use, an in-house archives and research library, a workshop, and other areas for special events including social gatherings and lectures.

International artist-in-residence program
Artpace is known for their International Artist-in-Residence (IAIR) program. The IAIR artists are chosen by a guest curator and the program invites nine artists per year to live and work at Artpace in three different four month cycles. Each guest curator selects one artist from Texas, one from the United States, and one from around the world to Artpace to create original works of art. Each artist is provided with furnished accommodations, 24/7 studio and exhibition site access, living expenses, a grant to purchase materials, and travel reimbursements. The IAIR program provides artists with the resources and support needed to create art without restrictions. Each residency begins with an informal potluck dinner introducing the artists to the people of the local community, and at the end of the residency, a curator/ artist dialogue is held in conjunction with the opening of the exhibitions to help viewers contextualize the work.

Since 1995, over 250 artists from around the world have participated in the IAIR Program, and more than 80 curators have selected the resident artists. Former IAIR participants have gone on to receive numerous prestigious art awards including four Turner Prizes, nine MacArthur Fellows, fifteen Guggenheim Fellows, and over 84 artists have made appearances at the Venice Biennale and Whitney Biennial.

Educational programs
Thousands of school children have participated in Artpace's educational programs, as nurturing the creative spirit of every individual was important to founder Linda Pace. Artpace's education programs expose the youth of San Antonio to think critically about art by focusing on four core ideas: Look, Learn, Create, & Reflect. The education department at Artpace has K-12 programs, community programs (including Chalk It Up), U of Artpace (university programs), family day and adult programs. Chalk It Up is a popular annual citywide family-friendly event that promotes the importance of collaborative public art on the streets of downtown San Antonio. Each year, Houston Street in downtown San Antonio is transformed by the creation of original, non-permanent chalk  murals by artists of all ages and abilities. The event facilitates informal learning interactions between the community and contemporary artists. The legacy of making contemporary art and artists free and accessible to the local San Antonio community is still being realized.

See also 

 Ruby City (San Antonio)

References

External links

1995 establishments in Texas
Art galleries established in 1995
Contemporary art galleries in the United States
Art museums and galleries in Texas
Buildings and structures in San Antonio
Culture of San Antonio
Tourist attractions in San Antonio
Linda Pace